Rain or Shine is a 1930 American pre-Code film directed by Frank Capra and starring Joe Cook and Louise Fazenda. The film was adapted from a hit Broadway musical of the same name and was originally planned as a full-scale musical. Due to the public backlash against musical films (beginning in the latter part of the summer of 1930), all musical numbers were discarded before release. This move proved to be prudent as the film was a box office success, continuing the streak of hits Capra directed for the young Columbia Pictures studio.

Synopsis
A woman inherits her father's struggling travelling circus, and looks to the circus's manager, Smiley, to save the day when the performers conspire to strike during a performance.

Cast
Joe Cook as Smiley Johnson
Louise Fazenda as Frankie
Joan Peers as Mary Rainey
William Collier Jr. as Bud Conway
Tom Howard as Amos K. Shrewsberry
Dave Chasen as Dave
Alan Roscoe as Dalton
Adolph Milar as Foltz
Clarence Muse as Nero
Nella Walker as Mrs Conway
Edward Martindel as Mr Conway
Nora Lane as Grace Conway
Tyrell Davis as Lord Hugo Gwynne

Preservation
The film survives intact and has been broadcast on television and cable. The International Sound Version of this film also survives. Both versions have been released on DVD.

References

External links

1930 films
Circus films
American films based on plays
Films directed by Frank Capra
Columbia Pictures films
American black-and-white films
American comedy-drama films
1930 comedy-drama films
1930s American films